The Limpinwood Nature Reserve is a protected nature reserve that is located on the Northern Rivers region of New South Wales, in eastern Australia.

The reserve is part of the Shield Volcano group of the UNESCO World Heritagelisted Gondwana Rainforests of Australia inscribed in 1986 and added to the Australian National Heritage List in 2007. It is also part of the Scenic Rim Important Bird Area, identified as such by BirdLife International because of its importance in the conservation of several species of threatened birds.

Description
Its vegetation is primarily sub-tropical rain forest with some wet sclerophyll forest.

Two watercourses named Hidden and Finches Creeks flow to the east out of the reserve. It was dedicated as a Flora Reserve in 1963. Flora Reserve is the highest protected status for forest areas in the Australian National Parks system. Prior to 1963 the area was classified as a Forest Reserve. The fringes of the reserve were logged for red cedar, hoop pine and white beech. Bullock teams were used to drag out the logs. The reserve is composed of virgin old growth sub-tropical rain forest and hardwood species - flooded gum, tallowwood, ironbark and white mahogany.

The reserve has no formed walking tracks. It has no public access except through Lamington National Park in Queensland. On the New South Wales side of the border it is bounded by private landholdings. It is intended to be a place where the flora and fauna are free from interference from humans, domestic animals and feral pests.

See also

 Protected areas of New South Wales
 High Conservation Value Old Growth forest

References

External links

Nature reserves in New South Wales
Gondwana Rainforests of Australia
Forests of New South Wales
Important Bird Areas of New South Wales
Northern Rivers
1963 establishments in Australia
Protected areas established in 1963